Jabalpur–Bhopal Express  was a daily overnight Superfast Express train of the Indian Railways, which runs between  railway station of Jabalpur, one of the important city & military cantonment hub of Central Indian state Madhya Pradesh and , the main railway station in Bhopal, the capital city of Madhya Pradesh.The train is now extended up to  of Indore in[Madhya Pradesh and run as Jabalpur–Indore Overnight Express.

Number and nomenclature
The number allowted for the train is :
1473 - From Bhopal to Jabalpur
1474 - From Jabalpur to Bhopal

Arrival and departure
The train is now cancelled and is no more operational.

Routes and halts
The train was going via . The important halt of the train were Katni, Damoh, Sagar, Khurai, Bina and Vidisha.

Locomotive
The train was hauled by ET WDM-3 diesel locomotive of the Itarsi Shed.

Coach composite
The train was consisting of 19 coaches as follow :
1 AC I Tier
2 AC II Tier
2 AC III Tier
10 Sleeper class
3 General
1 Luggage/brake van

Rail transport in Madhya Pradesh
Transport in Bhopal
Transport in Jabalpur
Railway services introduced in 2003
Defunct trains in India